Markus Svendsen (born 28 February 1941 in Havøysund) is a Norwegian skier. He was born in Havøysund and represented the club IL i BUL, Oslo. He competed in Nordic combined at the 1968 Winter Olympics in Grenoble, where he placed 27th.

References

External links

1941 births
Living people
People from Måsøy
Norwegian male Nordic combined skiers
Olympic Nordic combined skiers of Norway
Nordic combined skiers at the 1968 Winter Olympics
Sportspeople from Troms og Finnmark
20th-century Norwegian people